St John's Grammar School is an independent Anglican co-educational early learning, primary, and secondary day school located in Belair in the Adelaide Hills, about  south of the Adelaide city centre. It caters for students from early learning through to Year 12.

Overview
St John's Grammar School was founded in 1958. It operates from three campuses; the Junior School is adjacent to Belair National Park and the Belair railway station, the Early Learning Centre is opposite the Junior School, and the Secondary School, setup in 1998, occupies the site of the former Retreat House and St Barnabas Theological College. The school offers a range of subjects to its students, who begin electing their courses from Year 8. St John's has traditionally had a strong emphasis on music, winning numerous awards in this area. (See South Australian Choral Eisteddfod for details). The school offers a range of co-curricular activities, including various sports like soccer volley ball netball and sailing , music, debating, future problem solving, Pedal Prix, Duke of Edinburgh, and school productions. In 2006, the school entered into a partnership with EFM Health Clubs to provide an on-site health and fitness studio for curriculum use.

House system
St John's Grammar has a rich house life. Students from each house compete with each other every Friday in a range of sports and co-curricular activities. Points from the house activities go towards the House Shield. There are four houses named after pioneers of the Belair area. The school has a pastoral care system through which students are placed into one of these houses and encouraged to participate in house life. The houses are:
Gooch (red)
Halstead (green)
Moffatt (yellow)
Prince (blue)

Campus
There are three campuses:
Early Learning Campus (3-4 year olds)
Junior Campus (Reception - Year 6)
Secondary Campus (Years 7-12)

Extracurricular activities

Music and arts
The secondary school stages a musical in the even years, with a cabaret in the odd years.  The drama productions have included adaptions of well-known stories such as Little Shop of Horrors, Peter Pan and Charlie and the Chocolate Factory.

Notable alumni
Kassandra Clementi (2008)actress 
Tiffany Cromwell (2005)Australian cyclist
Annette Edmondson (2009)Australian Olympic cyclist and Olympic Bronze Medallist in Women's Omnium
Alexander EdmondsonAustralian Olympic cyclist
Ben Nicholasactor from Australian soap opera, Neighbours
Sarah Snookactress
Morgan Yaeger – Australian basketball player

See also

List of Anglican schools in Australia

References

External links
 St John's Grammar School

1958 establishments in Australia
Educational institutions established in 1958
Anglican primary schools in Adelaide
Junior School Heads Association of Australia Member Schools
Anglican secondary schools in Adelaide
Adelaide Hills